Andrej Križaj (born September 11, 1986) is a Slovenian alpine skier.

Križaj represented Slovenia at the  2010 Winter Olympics.

References 

1986 births
Living people
Slovenian male alpine skiers
Alpine skiers at the 2010 Winter Olympics
Olympic alpine skiers of Slovenia